Andrew Catlin is an English photographer, artist, director, cinematographer and filmmaker. His work has been widely published, and is included in numerous collections, books, exhibitions and archives.

History
Catlin grew up intrigued by both arts and science. His father was a drama producer at the BBC, his mother a senior staff member at the Royal College of Art. His childhood was spent in London in the 1960s.

In 1978, he was awarded the Prince Philip Prize for Zoology by the Zoological Society of London for a research project completed while at school. After attending University College London, he continued his studies with a psychology degree at Durham University before returning to London to do a research degree in Learning and Development at University College London.

During this time he developed his interest in photography. Early work for NME, Melody Maker, Smash Hits, POP and Spin quickly extended to other publications, and commissions from record companies, musicians, designers and artists internationally. His work appeared on record sleeves, books and magazine covers. He was one of the photographers chosen to document the Live Aid concert in 1985 and was the largest single contributor to the subsequent exhibition and book.

He has continued to work extensively with musicians, documenting a wide reaching spread of artists and genres.

During the 1980s he began directing music videos. During a visit to Japan while working with Bryan Adams, he was experimenting with a Super-8 movie camera, when Adams asked if he would film one of his live songs. The black and white clip that followed was reviewed by Chrissy Iley in Direction Magazine as a great debut. His second video, for the Cowboy Junkies track, Blue Moon was given a feature in Direction: "Blue Moon surprised me, impressed me, and I'm hard to impress, especially with performance videos. Its approach is not clinical or technical or corporate. But its flickered lights and sepia faces strike a mood that few directors of the three-minute clip even bother to think necessary. The facial expressions are important to him, and are carefully monitored with his portraiture eye. Fortunately, MTV shared my view and put it on heavy rotation."(Chrissy Iley).

Catlin was Director of Photography for Elements of Mine, a film by Egyptian director Khaled El Hagar which was awarded First Prize in the Toronto Moving Pictures Festival (MoPix Award 2004). 

In 2008, drawing together experience from photography, filmmaking and graphic design, he began a project called "The Matrix Series", exploring graphic compositions with complex multi-frame narratives. Each piece was shot as a set of images designed to interact in multiple dimensions, combining elements of time, movement, rhythm, narrative and graphic structure, while remaining within an essentially documentary framework. In his essay "Nine Hastings Photographers" Vasileios Kantas proposes that "Andrew Catlin’s imagery formations could be considered as a study on perception. His matrix suggests a unique syntax, of which the visual elements have been formed partly coincidentally - the subject’s actions - and partly in a controllable way - the photographer’s decisions. The way the sub-frames are selected and positioned in the matrix is preconceived, though it does not serve the linearity of time which seems to be loosened, if not abolished. The display of the sub-frames allows different reading strategies, seemingly serving many goals simultaneously." Sean O'Hagan, photography writer for The Observer, notes "In his Matrix series, he has somehow merged the rigorously formal with the luminously observational.  Whereas the likes of Blossfeldt and the Bechers created visual typologies, arranging plants and industrial water towers respectively in grids that echo the natural and man-made sameness of their subjects, Catlin has used the grid format to render a series of what he calls “critical” moments. The resulting images are both formally detached and acutely observational, ordered yet intimate. ... Andrew Catlin is a photographer with a scientific eye. He is obsessive, meticulous and rigorous, but also a quiet, unobtrusive observer of the everyday sublime. It shines brightly though his big pictures."

Catlin was quoted on photography in Varsity Magazine: "For me a great photograph needs to have a sense of intrigue. There needs to be a reason to revisit it again and again. Unanswered questions that make further exploration of the image an imperative. Reinterpretation through imagination, consideration and connection. If a picture doesn't have the depth to engage in these ways – if it doesn't make you think and reflect – it may have great visual or emotional impact, but it is superficial."

"A photographer must first see. An act of observation, study and recognition. Second, record. The act of composition, a feeling for light, interpretation. Thirdly, reflect. Consider in more depth the meaning of the image. Edit from a sequence; perhaps change the colour, density, contrast or light in the picture to adjust balance, weight and emphasis within the frame. Some photographers crop, others never do as a matter of principle."

His photography is held in major collections and archives worldwide, ranging from The National Portrait Gallery in London to the Schwules Museum in Berlin.

Selected exhibitions and collections
The Diorama (London) -  Last Few Days
National Portrait Gallery (London) Collection
Live Aid Exhibition (London) (1985)
L'Escargot (London)
Browns (London)
Electro Gallery (St. Leonards)
Schwules Museum (Berlin)
SoCo Gallery (Hastings)
British Council Touring Exhibition (international)
NME (London)
The Photographers' Gallery (London)
National Portrait Gallery (London) - She Bop (2003)
Paul Smith Collection (London)
National Portrait Gallery (London) - Benjamin's Britain (2006)
National Portrait Gallery (London) - Four Corners (2007)
The Enterprise (London) (2009)
F-ish Gallery (Hastings) (2011)
Bodelwyddan Castle - Made in 1988 Exhibition (2013)
Lucy Bell Gallery (2013)
Trinity 7 Gallery - Matrix (Hastings) (2014)
Tullie House Museum and Art Gallery - Picture the Poet (Carlisle) (2016)
The Gallery (Liverpool) - Marc Almond: Addicted to Excess (2017)
Beningbrough Hall (York) - Making Her Mark (2017)
Lucy Bell Gallery - Contact Sheets (2018)
National Portrait Gallery (London) - Contemporary Portraits (2019)
Coastal Currents (2019)
Lucy Bell Gallery - Friends of Derek (2020)
Baker Mamanova Gallery - Rebel Song: Faces of Irish Music (2021)
BIF Festival Belgrade - Rebel Song: Faces of Irish Music (2022)

Books: photography credits
Live Aid: The Official Book (1985), paperback  
King Ink by Nick Cave (1988), hardcover
Bryan Adams by Bryan Adams and Andrew Catlin (1995), editions: hardcover, paperback
A Drink with Shane MacGowan (paperback & hardback) by Shane MacGowan (author), Victoria Mary Clarke (2001)
Pogue Mahone Kiss My Arse: The Story of the Pogues by Carol Clerk (2007), editions: hardcover, paperback
It Crawled from the South: An R.E.M. Companion by Marcus Gray, editions: hardcover, paperback 
Wire: Everybody Loves a History by Kevin S. Eden (1991), editions: softcover 
Nick Cave by Maximilian Dax (1999), hardcover 
Tape Delay: Confessions from the Eighties Underground by Charles Neal (2001), editions: softcover They're Not Laughing Now by Alexander Brattell and Andrew Catlin (2010), editions: hardcoverVel by Andrew Catlin, Susheela Raman and Sam Mills (2011), editions: hardcoverThe Jesus and Mary Chain, by Andrew Catlin, Jim Reid and Julie Reid (2012), editions: hardcover Here Comes Everybody: The Story of the Pogues, by James Fearnley (2014), editions: softcover , 9780571255405Marc Almond's Visual Tome, by Ian David Monroe (2014), editions: hardcover Marc Almond - Trials of Eyeliner, by Alex Petridis (2016), editions: hardcoverSinéad O'Connor 48, by Andrew Catlin (2017), editions: hardcover Shane MacGowan Threescore, by Andrew Catlin (2018), editions: hardcover Rebel Song: Faces of Irish Music, by Andrew Catlin (2021), editions: hardcover A Furious Devotion: The Authorised Story of Shane MacGowan, by Richard Balls (2021), editions: hardcover , softcoverA Drink with Shane MacGowan (Italian Edition), by Shane MacGowan and Victoria Mary Clarke (2001), editions: paperback (2022)The Eternal Buzz and the Crock of Gold'', by Shane MacGowan (2022), editions: Hardcover - Limited Edition of 1000

Record covers: selected photography credits

Selected music videos: director of photography credits
David Holmes: "69 Police" (2000)
Medal: ‘Porno Song’ (1999)
Medal: ‘Up Here For Hours’ (1999)
Delakota: '555' (1998)
Delakota: 'C’mon Cincinnati' (1998)
Ether: ‘Best Friend’ (1999)
Satellite Beach: ‘Psycho’ (1998)
Ether: ‘She Could Fly’ (1998)
Iron Maiden: 'The Angel & The Gambler' (1998)
Radiator: ‘I Am’ (1997)
Ether: ‘If You If Really Want To Know’ (1997)
Naimee Coleman: 'Care About You' (1996)
Eternal: 'Secrets' (1996)
Planet Claire: ‘Say’ (1996)
Planet Claire: ‘21’ (1996)
World Domination Enterprises: 'Company News' (1988)
World Domination Enterprises: 'Can't Live Without My Radio' (1988)
That Petrol Emotion: 'Detonate' (1993)
Ed Harcourt: 'Black Feathers' (2009)
William Orbit: 'Hello Waveforms' (2006)
Princess Diana Tribute: 'We Are the World' (1997)

Selected music videos: director credit
Aref Durvesh: 'Outerindia One' (dir/DOP: Andrew Catlin) (2009)
Susheela Raman: 'Ganapati' (dir/DOP: Andrew Catlin) (2001)
Susheela Raman: 'Salt Rain' (dir/DOP: Andrew Catlin) (2001)
Susheela Raman: 'Maya' (dir/DOP: Andrew Catlin) (2002)
Susheela Raman: 'Orphea' (dir/DOP: Andrew Catlin) (2010)
Susheela Raman: 'Tomorrow Never Knows' (dir/DOP: Andrew Catlin) (2016)
Susheela Raman: 'Annabel' (dir/DOP: Andrew Catlin) (2018)
Susheela Raman: 'Tanpa Nama' (dir/DOP: Andrew Catlin) (2018)
Susheela Raman: 'Ghost' (dir/DOP: Andrew Catlin) (2019)
Susheela Raman: 'Going Down' (dir/DOP: Andrew Catlin) (2019)
Susheela Raman: 'Spoons' (dir/DOP: Andrew Catlin) (2019)
Susheela Raman: 'Sphinx' (dir/DOP: Andrew Catlin) (2019)
Susheela Raman: 'Beautiful Moon' (dir/DOP: Andrew Catlin) (2019)
Doros Quintet: 'Cherubim' (dir/DOP: Andrew Catlin) (2015)
Deacon Blue: 'Love and Regret' (dir/DOP: Andrew Catlin) (1989)
Pogues: 'Rainy Night in Soho' (dir/DOP: Andrew Catlin) (1991)
Kinky Machine: 'Supernatural Giver' (dir: Andrew Catlin) (1992)
Fin: "Sweet Obsession" (dir: Andrew Catlin) (1992)
Pooka: "City Sick" (dir: Andrew Catlin) (1993)
Scalaland: ‘Snow White Lies’ (dir/DOP: Andrew Catlin) (1995)
Scalaland: ‘Call Me’ (dir/DOP: Andrew Catlin) (1995)
Bryan Adams: 'Please Forgive Me' (dir: Andrew Catlin) (1993)
Bryan Adams: 'Straight from the Heart '(5 screen version) (dir: Andrew Catlin) (1993)
Bryan Adams: 'Summer of '69' (Live) (dir: Andrew Catlin) (1993)
Bryan Adams: 'Run To You' (Live) (dir: Andrew Catlin) (1992)
Bryan Adams: 'Into the Fire' (dir/DOP: Andrew Catlin) (1988)
Bryan Adams: 'When the Night Comes' (dir: Andrew Catlin) (1993)
Bryan Adams: 'Cmon Everybody' (dir: Andrew Catlin) (1993)
Bryan Adams: 'Let's Make a Night to Remember' (dir: Andrew Catlin) (1996)
C.C.: 'All Right' (dir/DOP: Andrew Catlin) (1995)
C.C.: 'Beautiful' (dir/DOP: Andrew Catlin) (1995)
C.C. 'Shelter' (dir/DOP: Andrew Catlin) (1995)
C.C.: 'Roots Scared'  (dir/DOP: Andrew Catlin) (1995)
Linda Eder 'From This Moment On' (dir/DOP: Andrew Catlin) (1989)
Cowboy Junkies: 'Blue Moon' (dir/DOP: Andrew Catlin) (1988)
Green on Red 'The Quarter' (dir/DOP: Andrew Catlin) (1989)
Green on Red 'Little Things' (dir/DOP: Andrew Catlin) (1989)
Green on Red 'Arrested' (dir/DOP: Andrew Catlin) (1989)

Music longforms / concerts
Bryan Adams: ‘When The Night Comes’ (Live) (dir: Andrew Catlin)
Susheela Raman: ‘The Queen Elizabeth Hall’ (Live) 2012 (dir: Andrew Catlin)
Susheela Raman: ‘Barbican’ (Live) 2017 (dir: Andrew Catlin)
Susheela Raman: ‘Souq Waqif’ (Recording) 2019 (dir: Andrew Catlin)
Susheela Raman: ‘Montpellier’ (Live) 2019 (dir: Andrew Catlin)

Films and documentaries: directing credits
Bryan Adams: Waking Up the World CBC Documentary (1993) (dir: Andrew Catlin)
Bryan Adams: Waking Up The World DVD Release (2003) (dir: Andrew Catlin)

Films and documentaries: director of photography credits
 Elements of Mine: (dir: Khaled El Hagar/Norbert Servos)
 Winner First Prize – Moving Pictures Festival, Toronto (MoPix Award 2004)
 Gumball 3000: documentary of First European rally/race. (1999) (dir. Simon Hilton)

References

External links

National Portrait Gallery
Summer of 69
Artnet
f-ish Exhibition Review
Varsity Interview
Blurb Interview
William Turnbull Portrait
Soundgarden Interview
Irish Cultural Centre

1960 births
Living people
Photographers from London
Documentary photographers
Alumni of St Cuthbert's Society, Durham
Alumni of University College London